William Creton (also Cretyng) (d. 1519) was a Canon of Windsor from 1489 to 1519.

Career
He was appointed:
Rector of South Molton (diocese of Exeter) 1486
Fellow of King's College, Cambridge
Prebendary of Combe and Harnham in Salisbury 1514

He was appointed to the tenth stall in St George's Chapel, Windsor Castle in 1489 and held the canonry until 1514.

Notes 

1519 deaths
Canons of Windsor
Fellows of King's College, Cambridge
Year of birth unknown